Brownstown is a village in Fayette County, Illinois, United States. The population was 759 at the 2010 census, up from 705 at the 2000 census.

Geography
U.S. Route 40 passes through the south side of the village, leading east  to St. Elmo and west  to Vandalia, the Fayette County seat.

Demographics

As of the census of 2000, there were 705 people, 293 households, and 189 families residing in the village. The racial makeup of the village was 98.01% White, 0.57% African American, 0.43% Native American, 0.14% Asian, 0.43% from other races, and 0.43% from two or more races. Hispanic or Latino of any race were 0.57% of the population.

There were 293 households, out of which 31.1% had children under the age of 18 living with them, 50.2% were married couples living together, 11.3% had a female householder with no husband present, and 35.2% were non-families. 31.1% of all households were made up of individuals, and 16.4% had someone living alone who was 65 years of age or older.  The average household size was 2.39 and the average family size was 2.93.

In the village, the population was spread out, with 25.2% under the age of 18, 9.5% from 18 to 24, 27.0% from 25 to 44, 21.8% from 45 to 64, and 16.5% who were 65 years of age or older.  The median age was 38 years. For every 100 females, there were 72.0 males.  For every 100 females age 18 and over, there were 78.6 males.

The median income for a household in the village was $28,839, and the median income for a family was $33,750. Males had a median income of $28,438 versus $21,250 for females. The per capita income for the village was $15,239.  About 9.9% of families and 14.8% of the population were below the poverty line, including 14.3% of those under age 18 and 13.1% of those age 65 or over.

Points of interest
Brownstown is host to the annual Fayette County Fair, held each summer in mid-July. The fair includes livestock shows, fine arts and culinary exhibits, tractor pulls, stock car races, a talent show, and a queen pageant.

References

Villages in Fayette County, Illinois
Villages in Illinois